Round Hill Village is a census-designated place (CDP) in northwestern Douglas County, Nevada, United States. The population was 759 at the 2010 census. Prior to 2010, the community was part of the Zephyr Cove–Round Hill Village CDP.

Geography
Round Hill Village is located on the east shore of Lake Tahoe in far western Nevada. U.S. Route 50 is the main road through the CDP, leading south  to the California state line and northeast  to Carson City. Zephyr Cove is immediately to the north, and Stateline is to the south. Kingsbury occupies the ridge to the east.

Demographics

See also
 List of census-designated places in Nevada

References

Census-designated places in Douglas County, Nevada
Census-designated places in Nevada